Jory is a 1973 American Western film directed by Jorge Fons and starring Robby Benson in the title role. It was adapted from the 1969 novel of the same name by Milton R. Bass.

Cast

 John Marley as Roy Starr
 B.J. Thomas as Jocko
 Robby Benson as Jory Walden
 Claudio Brook as Ethan Walden
 Patricia Aspíllaga as Carmelita Starr
 Brad Dexter as Jack
 Benny Baker as Frank Jordan
 Todd Martin as John Barron
 Quintín Bulnes as Walker
 Carlos Cortés as Logan
 John Kelly as Thatcher
 Anne Lockhart as Dora
 Ted Markland as Cpl. Hap Evans
 Linda Purl as Amy Barron
 Eduardo López Rojas as Cookie

See also
 List of American films of 1973

References

External links
 

1973 films
1973 Western (genre) films
American coming-of-age films
American Western (genre) films
Films based on Western (genre) novels
Films shot in Mexico
Embassy Pictures films
1970s English-language films
1970s American films